The Brazilian Baseball Championship is the highest competition of baseball in Brazil. It is organized by the Brazilian Baseball and Softball Confederation (CBBS).

The tournament consists of 16 local teams vying for the championship from October to November. In the first qualifying round, teams are divided into four groups. The top two teams in each group move on to the semifinals, with the finals being a one-game winner-take-all.

Teams
Guarulhos
Nip.Blue Jays
Dragons
Anhanguera
Gigante
Shida
Indaiatuba
Coopercotia
Gecebs
São Paulo
Suzano
Atibaia
Presidente Prudente
Cuiabá
Campo Grande
Dourados
Rio de Janeiro (1995)

See also
Baseball awards#Brazil

External links
CBBS Page

Baseball competitions in Brazil
Latin American baseball leagues
Sports leagues in Brazil